Sahaj Grover (born 7 September 1995) is a chess player from Delhi, India, who received the FIDE title of Grandmaster (GM) in September 2012.

He won the Under-10 World Youth Chess Championship in 2005 and came third in the Under-20 World Junior Chess Championship in 2011. He won the South African Open in 2017 and 2018.

References

External links
 
 

1995 births
Living people
Indian chess players
Chess grandmasters
World Youth Chess Champions